Vivian Girls are a Brooklyn-based indie rock group (named after the Darger characters).

Vivian Girls may also refer to:
Characters in a multimedia work by outsider artist Henry Darger
Vivian Girls (album), the debut album by lo-fi/punk band Vivian Girls
"Vivian Girls", a track on the 2000 album Winter Birds by dream-pop band Seely
"Vivian Girls", a track on the 2006 album Hidden World by experimental hardcore band Fucked Up
"Vivian Girls", a track on the 2007 album Left for Dead by indie-rock band Wussy
"The Vivian Girls", a track on Snakefinger's 1982 album Manual of Errors